Francis Xavier Aloysius James Jeremiah Keenan Wynn (July 27, 1916 – October 14, 1986) was an American character actor. His expressive face was his stock-in-trade; and though he rarely carried the lead role, he had prominent billing in most of his film and television roles.

Early life
Wynn was born on July 27, 1916, in New York City, the son of vaudeville comedian Ed Wynn and his wife, the former Hilda Keenan. He took his stage name from his maternal grandfather, Frank Keenan, one of the first Broadway actors to star in Hollywood. His father was Jewish and his mother was of Irish Catholic background. Ed Wynn encouraged his son to become an actor, and to join The Lambs Club, which he did in 1937.

Career

Theatre and radio
Wynn began his career as a stage actor. He appeared in several plays on Broadway, including Remember the Day (1935), Black Widow (1936), Hitch Your Wagon (1937), The Star Wagon (1938), One for the Money (1939), Two for the Show (1940), and The More the Merrier (1941).

Wynn starred in the radio show The Amazing Mr. Smith on Mutual Broadcasting System April 7 – June 30, 1941. He played the title role, "a carefree young man who runs into trouble galore and becomes an involuntary detective".

Film and television
Wynn appeared in hundreds of films and television series between 1934 and 1986. He was a Metro-Goldwyn-Mayer contract player during the 1940s and 1950s. He had a brief role as a belligerent, unsympathetic drunk in the wartime romance The Clock (1945). Arguably his most dynamic performance was a small role in The Hucksters (1948) with Clark Gable. His early postwar credits include The Three Musketeers (1948), playing D'Artagnan's servant; Annie Get Your Gun (1950); Royal Wedding (1951); Kiss Me, Kate (1953); The Man in the Gray Flannel Suit (1956); The Absent-Minded Professor (1961); The Americanization of Emily (1964) and Dr. Strangelove (1964).

The Wynns, father and son, both appeared in the original 1956 Playhouse 90 television production of Rod Serling's Requiem for a Heavyweight. The son was returning the favor: according to radio historian Elizabeth McLeod, Keenan had helped his father overcome professional collapse, a harrowing divorce, and a nervous breakdown to return to work a decade earlier, and now helped convince Serling and producer Martin Manulis that the elder Wynn should play the wistful trainer. Both he and his father also appeared in a subsequent TV drama called The Man in the Funny Suit (1960), which detailed the problems they had experienced while working on that series. In it, the Wynns, Serling, and many of the cast and crew played themselves. Keenan also featured in another Rod Serling production, a Twilight Zone episode entitled, "A World of His Own" (1960) as playwright Gregory West, who uniquely caused series creator Rod Serling to disappear.

On January 18, 1959, Wynn starred in S. J. Perelman's Hollywood satire, "Malice in Wonderland", broadcast on NBC's prestigious Sunday afternoon anthology series Omnibus.

In the 1959–1960 television season, Wynn co-starred with Bob Mathias in NBC's The Troubleshooters, an adventure program about unusual events surrounding an international construction company. Wynn played the role of Kodiak, the "troubleshooter", for Mathias's Frank Dugan. He appeared in numerous television series, such as the ABC/Warner Bros. drama, The Roaring 20s, The Islanders, and the ABC Western series, The Travels of Jaimie McPheeters.

Wynn took a dramatic turn as Yost in the crime drama Point Blank (1967) with Lee Marvin. He had a leading role in the third Beach Party movie, Bikini Beach (1964) as a scheming newspaper publisher who wants to banish the local young people. Later he played Hezakiah in the comedy film The Great Race (1965). He was the voice of the Winter Warlock in Santa Claus Is Comin' to Town (1970) and appeared in several Disney films, including Snowball Express (1972), Herbie Rides Again (1974) and The Shaggy D.A. (1976) (as a villain who learns Wilbur Daniels's secret and uses it against him).  He appeared as villainous businessman Alonzo Hawk in three Disney films – The Absent-Minded Professor, Son of Flubber, and Herbie Rides Again.

He appeared in Francis Coppola's musical Finian's Rainbow (1968), Sergio Leone's epic western Once Upon a Time in the West (also 1968), and Robert Altman's Nashville (1975). During this time, his guest television roles included Alias Smith and Jones (1971–1972), Emergency! (1975), Movin' On (1975) and The Bionic Woman (1978). Wynn appeared in ten episodes of TV's Dallas during the 1979–1980 season, playing the role of former Ewing family partner-turned-enemy Digger Barnes. David Wayne, a friend of Wynn's, had played Digger Barnes in 1978 but was unable to continue with the role because of his co-starring role on the CBS series, House Calls, starring Wayne Rogers.

Wynn was initially cast in Superman (1978) to play Perry White (the boss of Clark Kent and Lois Lane at the Daily Planet) in April 1977. By June (production had moved to Pinewood Studios in England), Wynn collapsed from exhaustion and was rushed to a hospital. He was replaced by Jackie Cooper. In 1983, he guest-starred in one of the last episodes of Taxi and Quincy, M.E. In 1984, he starred in the television film Call to Glory, which later became a weekly television series.

Personal life and last years

Wynn was married to former stage actress Eve Lynn Abbott (1914–2004) until their divorce in 1947, whereupon Abbott married actor Van Johnson, one of the couple's closest friends. Abbott contended her marriage to Wynn was a happy one, but that her divorce and remarriage were engineered by MGM studio boss Louis B. Mayer, who refused to renew Wynn's contract unless Abbott divorced him and married Johnson, who was the subject of rumors that he was homosexual. One son, actor and writer Ned Wynn (born Edmond Keenan Wynn), wrote the autobiographical memoir We Will Always Live In Beverly Hills. His other son, Tracy Keenan Wynn, is a screenwriter whose credits include The Longest Yard and The Autobiography of Miss Jane Pittman (both 1974). His daughter Hilda was married to Paul Williams. He was an uncle by marriage to the Hudson Brothers.  His granddaughter is actress Jessica Keenan Wynn.

Wynn suffered from painful ear infections which resulted in him shouting in a loud voice, which he had no control over. (Source: MGM Stock Company.)

In his later years, Wynn undertook a number of philanthropic endeavors and supported several charity groups. He was a long-standing active member of the Westwood Sertoma service club, in West Los Angeles.

During his last years, Wynn suffered from pancreatic cancer, which caused his death on October 14, 1986. His ashes are interred in Glendale's Forest Lawn Memorial Park in The Great Mausoleum, Daffodil Corridor, Columbarium of the Dawn, in a niche alongside his father Ed Wynn, his daughter Emily (February 13, 1960 – November 27, 1980), who died from lupus, and his aunt.

Filmography

Film

 Somewhere I'll Find You (1942) as Sergeant Tom Purdy (uncredited)
 The War Against Mrs. Hadley (1942) as Voice of Radio Announcer (uncredited)
 For Me and My Gal (1942) as Eddie Milton (uncredited)
 Northwest Rangers (1942) as 'Slip' O'Mara
 Lost Angel (1943) as Packy Roost
 See Here, Private Hargrove (1944) as Pvt. Mulvehill
 Since You Went Away (1944) as Lt. Solomon
 Marriage Is a Private Affair (1944) as Major Bob Wilton
 Without Love (1945) as Quentin Ladd
 The Clock (1945) as The Drunk
 Between Two Women (1945) as Tobey
 Ziegfeld Follies (1945) as Caller ('Number Please')
 Week-End at the Waldorf (1945) as Oliver Webson
 What Next, Corporal Hargrove? (1945) as Pvt. Thomas Mulvehill
 Easy to Wed (1946) as Warren Haggerty
 The Thrill of Brazil (1946) as Steve Farraugh
 No Leave, No Love (1946) as Slinky
 The Cockeyed Miracle (1946) as Ben Griggs
 The Hucksters (1947) as Buddy Hare
 Song of the Thin Man (1947) as Clarence 'Clinker' Krause
 B.F.'s Daughter (1948) as Martin Delwyn Ainsley
 The Three Musketeers (1948) as Planchet
 My Dear Secretary (1948) as Ronnie Hastings
 Neptune's Daughter (1949) as Joe Backett
 That Midnight Kiss (1949) as Artie Geoffrey Glenson
 Annie Get Your Gun (1950) as Charlie Davenport
 Love That Brute (1950) as Bugsy Welch
 Three Little Words (1950) as Charlie Kope
 Royal Wedding (1951) as Irving Klinger / Edgar Klinger
 Kind Lady (1951) as Edwards' Butler
 Texas Carnival (1951) as Dan Sabinas
 Angels in the Outfield (1951) as Fred Bayles
 It's a Big Country (1951) as Michael Fisher
 Phone Call from a Stranger (1952) as Eddie Hoke
 The Belle of New York (1952) as Max Ferris
 Skirts Ahoy! (1952) as Himself (uncredited)
 Holiday for Sinners (1952) as Joe Piavi
 Fearless Fagan (1952) as Sgt. Kellwin – Company J
 Desperate Search (1952) as Brandy
 Sky Full of Moon (1952) as Al
 Battle Circus (1953) as Sergeant Orvil Statt
 Code Two (1953) as Police Sgt. Jumbo Culdane
 Kiss Me Kate (1953) as Lippy
 All the Brothers Were Valiant (1953) as Silva
 The Long, Long Trailer (1954) as Policeman
 Tennessee Champ (1954) as Willy Wurble
 Men of the Fighting Lady (1954) as Lt. Commander Ted Dodson
 The Glass Slipper (1955) as Kovin
 The Marauders (1955) as Hook
 Running Wild (1955) as Ken Osanger
 Shack Out on 101 (1955) as George
 The Man in the Gray Flannel Suit (1956) as Sgt. Caesar Gardella
 The Naked Hills (1956) as Sam Wilkins
 Johnny Concho (1956) as Barney Clark
 The Great Man (1956) as Sid Moore
 Joe Butterfly (1957) as Harold Hathaway
 The Fuzzy Pink Nightgown (1957) as Dandy
 Don't Go Near the Water (1957) as Gordon Ripwell
 The Deep Six (1958) as Lt. Commander Mike Edge
 Touch of Evil (1958) as Bartender (uncredited)
 A Time to Love and a Time to Die (1958) as Reuter
 The Perfect Furlough (1958) as Harvey Franklin
 That Kind of Woman (1959) as Harry Corwin
 A Hole in the Head (1959) as Jerry Marks
 The Crowded Sky (1960) as Nick Hyland
 The Absent-Minded Professor (1961) as Alonzo P. Hawk
 The Joke and the Valley (1961, TV Movie) as Lambert Giles
 The Big Bankroll (1961) as Tom Fowler
 Il re di Poggioreale (Black City) (1961) as Di Gennaro
 The Power and the Glory (1961, TV Movie) as Wine Merchant
 Son of Flubber (1963) as Alonzo P. Hawk
 The Bay of St Michel (1963) as Nick Rawlings
 Man in the Middle (1964) as Lt. Charles Winston
 Dr. Strangelove (1964) as Colonel Bat Guano
 Honeymoon Hotel (1964) as Mr. Sampson
 Stage to Thunder Rock (1964) as Ross Sawyer
 The Patsy (1964) as Harry Silver
 Bikini Beach (1964) as Harvey Huntington Honeywagon
 The Americanization of Emily (1964) as Old Sailor
 Nightmare in the Sun (1965) as Junk dealer
 The Great Race (1965) as Hezekiah Sturdy
 Promise Her Anything (1966) as Angelo Carelli
 The Night of the Grizzly (1966) as Jed Curry
 Stagecoach (1966) as Luke Plummer
 Around the World Under the Sea (1966) as Hank Stahl
 Warning Shot (1967) as Sgt. Ed Musso
 Welcome to Hard Times (1967) as Zar
 The War Wagon (1967) as Wes Fletcher
 Point Blank (1967) as Yost
 Run Like a Thief (1967) as Willy Gore
 Frame Up (1968) as Inspector Donald
 The Longest Hunt (1968) as Major Charlie Doneghan
 Finian's Rainbow (1968) as Senator Billboard Rawkins
 Once Upon a Time in the West (1968) as Sheriff – Auctioneer
 The Magic Pear Tree (1968, Short) as Marquis (voice)
 Mackenna's Gold (1969) as Sanchez
 Smith! (1969) as Vince Heber
 The Monitors (1969) as The General
 80 Steps to Jonah (1969) as Barney Glover
 Viva Max! (1969) as General Lacomber
 House on Greenapple Road (1970, TV Movie) as Sgt. Charles Wilentz
 Loving (1970) as Edward
 Five Savage Men (1970) as Pudge Elliott
 Santa Claus Is Comin' to Town (1970, TV Movie) as The Winter Warlock (voice)
 Assault on the Wayne (1971, TV Movie) as Orville Kelly
 Pretty Maids All in a Row (1971) as Poldaski
 Cannon (1971) as Eddie
 The Man with Icy Eyes (1971) as Harry Davis
 Terror in the Sky (1971, TV Movie) as Milton
 The Manipulator (1971) as Old Charlie
 Panhandle 38 (1972) as Billy Bronson / Kile Richards
 Wild in the Sky (1972) as General Harry Gobohare
 Assignment: Munich (1972, TV Movie) as George
 Cancel My Reservation (1972) as Sheriff 'Houndtooth' Riley
 The Mechanic (1972) as Harry McKenna ['Big Harry']
 Snowball Express (1972) as Martin Ridgeway
 VD Attack Plan (1973, Short) as Contagion Corps Sergeant (narrator)
 Hijack! (1973) as Donny McDonald
 Herbie Rides Again (1974) as Alonzo P. Hawk
 The Internecine Project (1974) as E.J. Farnsworth
 The Legend of Earl Durand (1974) as Colonel Nightingale
 Hit Lady (1974, TV Movie) as Buddy McCormack
 Popcorn (1974, Short) (voice)
 Target Risk (1975, TV Movie) as Simon Cusack
 He Is My Brother (1975) as Brother Dalton
 Nashville (1975) as Mr. Green
 The Man Who Would Not Die (1975) as Victor Slidell
 The Devil's Rain (1975) as Sheriff Owens
 A Woman for All Men (1975) as Walter McCoy
 The Lindbergh Kidnapping Case (1976, TV Movie) as Fred Huisache
 20 Shades of Pink (1976, TV Movie)
 The Quest (1976, TV Movie) as H. H. Small
 Jeremiah of Jacob's Neck (1976, TV Movie) as Jeremiah Starbuck
 High Velocity (1976) as Mr. Andersen
 The Killer Inside Me (1976) as Chester Conway
 The Shaggy D.A. (1976) as John Slade
 The Quest: The Longest Drive (1976, TV Movie) as Cooler
 Mission to Glory: A True Story (1977)
 Orca (1977) as Novak
 Sex and the Married Woman (1977, TV Movie) as Uncle June
 Laserblast (1978) as Colonel Farley
 Coach (1978) as Fenton "F. R." Granger
 The Bastard (1978) as Johnny Malcolm
 Piranha (1978) as Jack
 The Lucifer Complex (1978) as U.S. Secretary of Defense / Adolph Hitler?
 The Billion Dollar Threat (1979 TV movie) as Ely
 The Dark (1979) as Sherman "Sherm" Moss
 Hollywood Knight (1979) as Jed
 Sunburn (1979) as Mark Elmes
 Parts: The Clonus Horror (1979) as Jake Noble
 The Glove (1979) as Bill Schwartz
 The Treasure Seekers (1979) as Meat Cleaver Stewart
 A Touch of the Sun (1979) as General Spelvin
 Just Tell Me What You Want (1980) as Seymour Berger
 Mom, the Wolfman and Me (1980, TV Movie) as Grandpa Bergman
 The Monkey Mission (1981, TV Movie) as Stump Harris
 A Piano for Mrs. Cimino (1982, TV Movie) as Barney Fellman
 The Capture of Grizzly Adams (1982, TV Movie) as Bert Woolman
 The Last Unicorn (1982) as Captain Cully / Harpy (voice)
 Best Friends (1982) as Tom Babson
 Hysterical (1983) as Fisherman
 Return of the Man from U.N.C.L.E. (1983, TV Movie) as Piers Castillian
 Wavelength (1983) as Dan
 Prime Risk (1985) as Dr. Lasser
 Code of Vengeance (1985, TV Movie) as Willis
 Mirrors (1985, TV Movie) as Reverend Dahlstrom
 Zoo Ship (1985) (voice)
 Black Moon Rising (1986) as Iron John
 Hyper Sapien: People from Another Star (1986) as Grandpa (final film role)

Television

 Wagon Train – Episode: "The Luke O'Malley Story" (1958) as Luke O'Malley
 The Untouchables (1959–1961) as Augie 'The Banker' Ciamino / Joe Fuselli
 The Twilight Zone – Episode: "A World of His Own" (1960) as Gregory West
 The Troubleshooters (1959–1960) as Kodiak
 Alfred Hitchcock Presents (TV series) – 1961 Episode "The Last Escape" as Ferlini
 Rawhide – Episode: "Incident at Cactus Wells" (1962) as Simon Royce
 Combat! – Episode: "The Prisoner" (1962) as Colonel Clyde
 Ben Casey – Episode: "Behold a Pale Horse" (1962) as O.J. Stanley
 Death Valley Days – Episode: "Grass Man" (1962) as Josh Tavers
 Bonanza – Episode: "Alias Joe Cartwright" (1964) as Sergeant O'Rourke
 Combat! – Episode: "The Flying Machine" (1966) as Lt. Brannagan
 The Wild Wild West – Episode: "The Night of the Freebooters" (1966) as Thorwald Wolfe
 Gomer Pyle, U.S.M.C. – Episode: "Show Me the Way to Go Home" (1966) as Harry Purcell
 Then Came Bronson – Episode: "The Old Motorcycle Fiasco" (1969) as Alex
 Lancer – Episode: "Blue Skies for Willie Sharpe" (1970) as Kansas Bill Sharpe
 Alias Smith and Jones (1971) as Artie Gorman / Horace Wingate / Charlie Utley
 Mod Squad – Episode: "And a Little Child Shall Bleed Them" (1971) as Luther
 Hawaii Five-O – Episode: "Journey Out of Limbo" (1972) as Hummel
 Cannon – Episode: "The Island Caper" (1972) as Matt Dixon
 Alias Smith and Jones – Episode: "What Happened at the XST?" (1972) as Artie Gorman
 McMillan & Wife – Episode: "The Devil You Say" (1973) as Professor Zagmeyer
 Hec Ramsey – Episode: "A Hard Road to Vengeance" (1973) as Bullard
 The New Perry Mason – Episode: "The Case of the Telltale Trunk" (1973) as Victor Harding
 The Girl With Something Extra – Episode: "Guess Who's Feeding the Pigeons" (1974) as Victor Lucas
 Kolchak: The Night Stalker (1974–1975) as Captain Joe 'Mad Dog' Siska
 Movin' On – Episode: "The Elephant Story" (1975) as Barnaby
 Emergency! – Episode: "Back-Up" (1975) as Wild Bill
 The Bob Newhart Show – Episode: "What's It All About, Albert?" (1975) as Dr. Albert
 The Bionic Woman – Episode: "Rancho Outcast" (1978) as Gustave
 Dallas – 10 episodes (1979–1980) as Digger Barnes
 The Littlest Hobo - Episode: "The Balloonist" (1980) as Gus Appleton (uncredited)
 Fantasy Island – Episode: "Mr. Nobody/La Liberatora" (1981) as Willie the promoter
 One Day at a Time – Episode: "Small Wonder II (1981) as Randolph Ericson
 The Greatest American Hero – Episode: "Good Samaritan" (1982) as Ira Hagert
 Hardcastle and McCormick – Episode: "Just Another Round of That Old Song" (1983) as Henry Willard
 Quincy, M.E. – Episode: "Whatever Happened to Morris Perlmutter?" (1983) as Morris Perlmutter
 Manimal – Episode: "Scrimshaw" (1983) as Clancy Sea Dog Morgan
 Taxi – Episode: "Tony's Baby" (1983) as Leo
 Tales from the Darkside – Episode: "I'll Give You a Million" (1984) as Duncan
 Highway to Heaven – Episode: "Popcorn, Peanuts and CrackerJacks" (1985) as Doc Brisby
 Call to Glory (1984–1985) as Carl Sarnac

References
Notes

External links

 
 
 
 
 

1916 births
1986 deaths
20th-century American male actors
American male comedy actors
American male film actors
American male stage actors
American male television actors
American male voice actors
American people of Czech-Jewish descent
American people of Irish descent
American people of Ottoman-Jewish descent
American people of Romanian-Jewish descent
Burials at Forest Lawn Memorial Park (Glendale)
Deaths from cancer in California
Deaths from pancreatic cancer
Male Spaghetti Western actors
Male Western (genre) film actors
Male actors from Los Angeles
Male actors from New York City
Metro-Goldwyn-Mayer contract players
Members of The Lambs Club